KIVY-FM (92.7 FM, "Country 92.7 FM") is a radio station broadcasting a country music format. Licensed to Crockett, Texas, United States, the station serves the areas of Huntsville, Lufkin, Trinity and Palestine. The station is currently owned by Leon Hunt and features programming from Citadel Media and Dial Global.

References

External links
 

IVY-FM
Country radio stations in the United States
Radio stations established in 1982
1982 establishments in Texas